John Chandler Bancroft Davis (December 29, 1822 – December 27, 1907), commonly known as (J. C.) Bancroft Davis, was an attorney, diplomat, judge of the Court of Claims and Reporter of Decisions of the Supreme Court of the United States.

Education and career

Born on December 29, 1822, in Worcester, Massachusetts, Davis read law in 1844 and received an Artium Baccalaureus degree in 1847 from Harvard University. He originally entered Harvard with the class of 1840 but was suspended in his senior year and did not graduate with his original class. He was Secretary and charge d'affaires for the London legation with the United States Department of State from 1849 to 1852. He entered private practice in New York City, New York from 1853 to 1862. He was an American correspondent for the London Times from 1854 to 1861. Because of ill health, Davis retired from his law work in 1862, and settled on a farm in rural New York until he regained his health. He was a member of the New York State Assembly (Orange County, 1st District) in 1869, but vacated his seat on March 26, 1869, to accept a federal post. He was a United States Assistant Secretary of State from 1869 to 1871, and from 1873 to 1874, under President Ulysses S. Grant. He was Secretary and United States Agent for the Joint High Commission in Geneva, Switzerland from 1871 to 1873. In 1874, he was appointed as the United States Envoy to the German Empire, serving in that position until 1877.

Federal judicial service

Davis was nominated by President Rutherford B. Hayes on December 12, 1877, to a seat on the Court of Claims (later the United States Court of Claims) vacated by Judge Edward G. Loring. He was confirmed by the United States Senate on December 14, 1877, and received his commission the same day. His service terminated on December 9, 1881, due to his resignation to again accept the post of United States Assistant Secretary of State from 1881 to 1882.

Davis was nominated by President Chester A. Arthur on December 13, 1882, to the seat on the Court of Claims vacated by himself. He was confirmed by the Senate on December 20, 1882, and received his commission the same day. His service terminated on November 5, 1883, due to his resignation.

Reporter of decisions

Davis served as Reporter of Decisions of the Supreme Court of the United States from 1883 to 1902.

Role in corporate personhood controversy

Acting as court reporter in Santa Clara County v. Southern Pacific Railroad – 118 U.S. 394 (1886), dealing with taxation of railroad properties, Davis plays a historical role in the corporate personhood debate. The position of court reporter entailed that he write "a summary-of-the-case commentary." Why Bancroft Davis's role in the controversy is worth mentioning is that he noted in the headnote to the court's opinion that the Chief Justice Morrison Waite began oral argument by stating, "The court does not wish to hear argument on the question whether the provision in the Fourteenth Amendment to the Constitution, which forbids a State to deny to any person within its jurisdiction the equal protection of the laws, applies to these corporations. We are all of the opinion that it does."

In a published account of Bancroft's collected Supreme Court reports and notes from 1885-1886, he wrote of the Santa Clara County v. Southern Pacific Railroad case that, "The defendant Corporations are persons within the intent of the clause in section 1 of the Fourteenth Amendment to the Constitution of the United States, which forbids a State to deny to any person within its jurisdiction the equal protection of the laws." Journalists and authors, such as Thom Hartman, have since cited Davis's prior position as president of Newburgh and New York Railway as evidence of a conflict of interest in the corporate personhood interpretation of a Supreme Court ruling dealing with a railroad. The controversy regarding Bancroft Davis's summary remains unsolved.

Death

Davis died on December 27, 1907, at his residence, Number 1621 H Street. N.W., in Washington, D.C.

Family

Davis was the son of John Davis, a Whig Governor of Massachusetts, and was the older brother of United States Representative Horace Davis.

Personal

On November 19, 1857, Davis married Frederica Gore King (1829–1916). Frederica was the daughter of James G. King (1791–1853), an American businessman and Whig Party politician and the granddaughter of both Archibald Gracie and Rufus King, who was the Federalist candidate for both Vice President (1804 and 1808) and President of the United States (1816). They did not have any children.

Honors

Davis was elected a member of the American Antiquarian Society in 1851.

Works
(1847) The Massachusetts Justice 
(1871) The Case of the United States Laid before the Tribunal of Arbitration at Geneva 
(1873) Treaties and Conventions Concluded between the United States of America and Other Powers, Since July 4, 1776 (Revised edition) 
(1893) Mr. Fish and the Alabama Claims: A Chapter in Diplomatic History , 
(1897) Origin of the Book of Common Prayer of the Protestant Episcopal Church in the United States of America

See also

Davis political family

References

Sources
 
 The United States Court of Claims : a history / pt. 1. The judges, 1855–1976 / by Marion T. Bennett / pt. 2. Origin, development, jurisdiction, 1855–1978 / W. Cowen, P. Nichols, M.T. Bennett. Washington, D.C. : Committee on the Bicentennial of Independence and the Constitution of the Judicial Conference of the United States, 1976 i.e. 1977–1978. 2 vols.
 
 

1822 births
1907 deaths
American legal writers
Harvard University alumni
Republican Party members of the New York State Assembly
New York (state) lawyers
Politicians from Worcester, Massachusetts
Reporters of Decisions of the Supreme Court of the United States
Ambassadors of the United States to Germany
United States Assistant Secretaries of State
Judges of the United States Court of Claims
United States Article I federal judges appointed by Rutherford B. Hayes
19th-century American judges
United States Article I federal judges appointed by Chester A. Arthur
19th-century American diplomats
Gardiner family
Members of the American Antiquarian Society